Cari Elise Fletcher (born March 19, 1994), known mononymously by her last name (stylized as FLETCHER), is an American singer and songwriter. Fletcher's breakthrough single "Undrunk" was released in January 2019 and became her first single to chart on the Billboard Hot 100, and reached number one on Spotify's Viral Chart in the United States. "Undrunk" was released on her second extended play You Ruined New York City for Me, and according to Mediabase, the song was the fastest-rising song at pop radio for a new artist since 2014.

Her debut single as a solo artist, "War Paint", was released in June 2015. Her 2016 single, "Wasted Youth", reached No. 1 on Billboard Emerging Artist Chart. Fletcher was included on Forbes 2022 30 under 30 list. She released her album Girl of My Dreams in 2022.

Early life
Fletcher was born in Asbury Park, New Jersey, to Bob and Noreen (née Napolitani) Fletcher; her father owned several car dealerships and her mother was a flight attendant. She began taking vocal lessons at the age of five.

In 2012, Fletcher graduated from Wall High School in nearby Wall Township, New Jersey, where she played women's volleyball. Upon graduating high school, she attended the Clive Davis Institute of Recorded Music at New York University (NYU). She took a year-long leave of absence and moved to Nashville, Tennessee, to pursue music full time, but completed NYU in 2016. She currently is based in Los Angeles.

Career

In 2011, Fletcher competed on the premiere season of The X Factor. In the boot camp round, Simon Cowell paired Fletcher with Hayley Orrantia, Paige Elizabeth Ogle, and Dani Knights to form the group Lakoda Rayne under mentorship of Paula Abdul. They disbanded after being eliminated from the competition. In 2015, she moved to Nashville, Tennessee and began collaborating with producer Jamie Kenney, during which the single "War Paint" was released. The song went viral on Spotify after its release. In 2016, Spotify added Fletcher to their Spotify Spotlight list, helping catapult her as an independent artist. She was invited to speak on behalf of the company at Fortune Tech Conference in 2019 as a success story. In September 2016, she released her debut EP Finding Fletcher independently.

In August 2018, Fletcher announced  that she had signed with Capitol Records, which is based in Los Angeles. She released her single "Undrunk" on January 25, 2019 and subsequently made her television debut on The Tonight Show Starring Jimmy Fallon. She also performed at Bonnaroo Music Festival, Life Is Beautiful Music & Art Festival, Lollapalooza that year.

In April 2019, she released "If You're Gonna Lie", marketed as a prequel to "Undrunk" and "About You", another single about the same ex. In August 2019, Fletcher released her second EP You Ruined New York City for Me, with all prior releases along with two new songs, "All Love" and "Strangers". In October 2019, Fletcher was announced as an opening act for Niall Horan's Nice to Meet Ya Tour, set to begin in 2020 before it was cancelled due to the COVID-19 pandemic.

In September 2020, Fletcher released her EP, The S(ex) Tapes, which shares the raw aftermath of a breakup. She later released "Cherry" with Hayley Kiyoko, which Elle called "luscious, flirtatious, but fun".

On September 16, 2022, she released her debut album Girl of My Dreams, which debuted at number fifteen on the US Billboard 200.

Personal life
Fletcher released "I Believe You" in support of sexual assault survivors in March 2018, penning a #MeToo-inspired letter to Billboard. She supported the movement with appearances at It's On Us and the United State of Women Summit. She's also participated in Girl Up and the Teen Vogue Summit in support of women's empowerment efforts.

Fletcher is a member of the LGBTQ+ community, and actively supports organizations such as GLAAD, The Trevor Project and It Gets Better. In March 2017, she told Billboard "I definitely identify within the LGBTQ community, but as far as putting a label on like gay, straight, bisexual, lesbian, queer... it's all in the family and spectrum, and sexuality and gender is not black and white. It's a spectrum that we all fall somewhere in the world on. That's how I feel comfortable expressing myself – loving who I feel like loving and who I'm attracted to." In December 2021, Fletcher stated that she identifies as queer and "attracted to strong feminine energy which [sic] just so happens to more likely than not be women".

From 2017 to 2020, Fletcher dated YouTuber Shannon Beveridge. In 2017, Beveridge starred in the music video for her single "Wasted Youth". Fletcher's third EP The S(ex) Tapes, released in 2020, was inspired by the aftermath of their breakup. Beveridge filmed and directed all of the music videos for the EP, including "Sex (With My Ex)". In July 2022, Fletcher released the single "Becky's So Hot" about Beveridge's current girlfriend.

Influences

Growing up, she was inspired by vocalists like Celine Dion, Mariah Carey, and Whitney Houston. She cited Bob Marley, and fellow New Jersey artists Bruce Springsteen, Bon Jovi, and Patti Smith as influences. Fletcher has also expressed admiration for Madonna, Lady Gaga, and Troye Sivan.

Discography

 Girl of My Dreams (2022)

Filmography

Television

Tours
Headline
 Finding Fletcher Tour (2017)
 You Ruined New York City For Me Tour (2019)
 Fletcher 2020 Tour (2020), postponed due to COVID-19
 Girl of My Dreams Tour (2022)

Supporting
LANY – Malibu Nights World Tour (2019)
Panic! at the Disco – Viva Las Vengeance Tour Europe 2023

References

External links
 
 

1994 births
American people of Italian descent
LGBT people from New Jersey
American LGBT rights activists
American LGBT singers
American LGBT songwriters
Living people
People from Asbury Park, New Jersey
People from Wall Township, New Jersey
Singers from New Jersey
Wall High School (New Jersey) alumni
The X Factor (American TV series) contestants